The designations U Centauri and u Centauri refer to two different stars in the constellation Centaurus.

 U Centauri, the variable star designation for a faint Mira variable
 HD 108541, a B-type main-sequence star also known by its Latin-letter Bayer designation u Centauri

Centaurus (constellation)